Walter Proch (born 17 February 1984 in Rovereto) is an Italian former cyclist.

Major results
2005
 3rd Giro del Canavese
 9th Gran Premio della Liberazione
2006
 4th Tour du Jura
 4th Coppa Città di Asti
 8th Trofeo Città di Brescia
2008
 1st Stage 3 Tour Ivoirien de la Paix
 9th Overall Regio-Tour
2009
 6th Memorial Marco Pantani

References

1984 births
Living people
Italian male cyclists
People from Rovereto
Sportspeople from Trentino
Cyclists from Trentino-Alto Adige/Südtirol